The CHL/NHL Top Prospects Game is an annual event in which forty of the top NHL Entry Draft eligible prospects in the Canadian Hockey League play against each other in an all-star game environment. Players are able to boost their draft ranking with the National Hockey League scouts and general managers attending. Each team is led by a celebrity coach, usually Don Cherry and Bobby Orr.

From 1992 to 1995 the event was known as the CHL All–Star Challenge, between the three constituent leagues of the CHL. In 1996, the Canadian Hockey League entered into a partnership with the National Hockey League to create a prospects game. Rosters for the event are chosen in conjunction with the NHL's central scouting and general managers. The CHL announced Home Hardware as the corporate title sponsor of the event starting in 2000, followed by Bank of Montreal (BMO) in 2014, Sherwin-Williams in 2017, and Kubota in 2020.

1992 CHL All–Star Challenge
The inaugural CHL All–Star Challenge featured the host Western Hockey League team, versus and a combined team from the Ontario Hockey League and the Quebec Major Junior Hockey League. John Spoltore of the North Bay Centennials scored twice for the East, and Dean McAmmond of the Prince Albert Raiders scored the winning goal in overtime for the West.

1993 CHL All–Star Challenge
In the second CHL All–Star Challenge, the Quebec Major Junior Hockey League hosted a combined team from the Western Hockey League and the Ontario Hockey League. Claude Savoie of the Victoriaville Tigres, and Martin Gendron of the Saint-Hyacinthe Laser, both scored twice for the QMJHL, but the WHL/OHL scored five goals in the third period to win the game.

1994 CHL All–Star Challenge
In the third CHL All–Star Challenge, the Quebec Major Junior Hockey League hosted a combined team from the Western Hockey League and the Ontario Hockey League. Sixteen goals were scored by fifteen different players, with Jeff Shevalier of the North Bay Centennials, scoring twice. Quebec led 4–2 after the first period, but were outscored 4–1 by the OHL/WHL in the third period.

1995 CHL All–Star Challenge
The fourth CHL All–Star Challenge was hosted by the Ontario Hockey League, versus a combined team from the Quebec Major Junior Hockey League and the Western Hockey League. The QMJHL/WHL scored the first five goals of the game, and won 8–3, led by two goals each from Eric Daze of the Beauport Harfangs, and Terry Ryan of the Tri-City Americans.

1996 CHL/NHL Top Prospects Game
The first CHL/NHL Top Prospects Game in 1996, was coached by celebrities Don Cherry and Bobby Orr, joined by assistants, Brian Kilrea, Blair Machasey, and Bob Loucks. Team Cherry won 9–3, led by Lance Ward of the Red Deer Rebels, and Jean-Pierre Dumont of the Val-d'Or Foreurs scoring two goals each.

1997 CHL/NHL Top Prospects Game
Cherry and Orr continued as coaches for the 1997 CHL/NHL Top Prospects Game. Brian Kilrea and Bert O'Brien of the Ottawa 67's joined Cherry as assistants. Orr was joined by Michel Therrien of the Granby Prédateurs, and Todd McLellan of the Swift Current Broncos. Team Orr led 4–0 after the first period, and won 7–2. Goaltender Roberto Luongo of the Val-d'Or Foreurs, made 29 saves in the victory. Jeff Zehr of the Windsor Spitfires, and Daniel Cleary of the Belleville Bulls scored two goals each.

1998 CHL/NHL Top Prospects Game
Cherry and Orr continued as coaches for the 1998 CHL/NHL Top Prospects Game. Brian Kilrea returned as an assistant coach to Cherry, and Claude Julien of the Hull Olympiques, and Brent Peterson of the Portland Winter Hawks, joined Orr. Team Cherry lead 3–0 halfway through the game, and held on for a 4–2 win. Six different players scored one goal each, and goaltender Philippe Sauvé of the Rimouski Océanic stopped all 23 shots he faced.

1999 CHL/NHL Top Prospects Game
Cherry and Orr continued as coaches for the 1999 CHL/NHL Top Prospects Game. Lanny McDonald and Brian Kilrea were assistant coaches to Cherry, and Dean Clark of the Calgary Hitmen, and Gaston Therrien of the Val-d'Or Foreurs, joined Orr. Team Cherry outshot Team Orr 42–25, but Team Orr won 4–3.

2000 Home Hardware Top Prospects Game

The CHL announced Home Hardware as the corporate title sponsor of the event, starting in 2000. Cherry and Orr continued as coaches for the 2000 Home Hardware Top Prospects Game. Brian Kilrea returned as an assistant coach to Cherry, and Dean Clark returned with Orr. Team Orr scored three goals in the third period, and won 6–3. Nathan Smith of the Swift Current Broncos scored twice for Team Orr, and Gerard Dicaire of the Seattle Thunderbirds scored two points for Team Cherry.

2001 Home Hardware Top Prospects Game
Cherry and Orr continued as coaches for the 2001 Home Hardware Top Prospects Game. Lanny McDonald and Brian Kilrea were assistant coaches to Cherry, and Brent Sutter of the Red Deer Rebels, and Doris Labonté of the Rimouski Océanic, joined Orr. Greg Watson of the Prince Albert Raiders scored two goals and two assists, to lead Team Orr to a 5–3 victory.

2002 Home Hardware Top Prospects Game
For the 2002 Home Hardware Top Prospects Game, the CHL announced Tiger Williams and Kelly Hrudey as the new celebrity coaches for the event. Bob Lowes of the Regina Pats, joined Williams and as assistant coach, and Kevin Dickie of the Saskatoon Blades, joined Hrudey. Pierre-Marc Bouchard of the Chicoutimi Saguenéens, and Joffrey Lupul of the Medicine Hat Tigers, both scored two goals. Petr Taticek of the Sault Ste. Marie Greyhounds scored a penalty shot goal as part of Team Tiger's four goals in the second period, in a 7–4 victory by Team Tiger.

2003 Home Hardware Top Prospects Game
Cherry and Orr returned as coaches for the 2003 Home Hardware Top Prospects Game. Brian Kilrea returned as an assistant coach to Cherry, and Peter DeBoer of the Kitchener Rangers, joined Orr. Frank Rediker of the Windsor Spitfires, had a goal and an assist for Team Cherry, and Mike Richards of the Kitchener Rangers, had two assists, for Team Orr. Team Cherry scored three goals in the third period to win 4–3.

2004 Home Hardware Top Prospects Game
Cherry and Orr continued as coaches for the 2004 Home Hardware Top Prospects Game. Dale Hunter and Jacques Beaulieu of the London Knights, were assistant coaches to Cherry, and Brian Kilrea and Bert O'Brien of the Ottawa 67's, joined Orr. Team Orr scored the first three and last three goals to win 6–2. Blake Comeau of the Kelowna Rockets, scored four points, and Rob Schremp of the London Knights scored three points for Team Orr.

2005 Home Hardware Top Prospects Game
Cherry continued as a coach for the 2005 Home Hardware Top Prospects Game. Orr was replaced by John Davidson as coach. Kenndal McArdle of the Moose Jaw Warriors scored two goals for Team Davidson. Gilbert Brulé of the Vancouver Giants scored two goals, leading Team Cherry to an 8–4 win.

2006 Home Hardware Top Prospects Game
Cherry and Orr reunited as coaches for the 2006 Home Hardware Top Prospects Game. Team Cherry scored the first goals of the game, on assists from Ty Wishart of the Prince George Cougars. Team Orr scored seven unanswered goals to win the game. Bryan Little of the Barrie Colts scored twice to lead the way.

2007 Home Hardware Top Prospects Game
For the 2007 Home Hardware Top Prospects Game, the CHL announced new celebrity coaches for the event. Scotty Bowman and Jacques Demers teamed up with Patrick Roy of the Quebec Remparts, to coach the white team. Pat Burns and Michel Bergeron teamed up with Benoit Groulx of the Gatineau Olympiques, to coach the red team. Oscar Moller of the Chilliwack Bruins, scored a goal and an assists for the white team. Ruslan Bashkirov of the Quebec Remparts, scored twice for the red team, leading to a 5–3 victory.

2008 Home Hardware Top Prospects Game
For the 2008 Home Hardware Top Prospects Game, the CHL announced new celebrity coaches for the event. Grant Fuhr and Glenn Anderson teamed up with Don Nachbaur of the Tri-City Americans, to coach the white team. Lanny McDonald and Mike Vernon teamed up with Kelly Kisio of the Calgary Hitmen, to coach the red team. Josh Bailey of the Windsor Spitfires, scored twice, and Cody Hodgson of the Brampton Battalion, added three assists, to help team white win 8–4.

2009 Home Hardware Top Prospects Game
Cherry and Orr reunited as coaches for the 2009 Home Hardware Top Prospects Game. Team Orr won 6–1, let by two goals each from Cody Eakin of the Swift Current Broncos, and David Gilbert of the Quebec Remparts.

2010 Home Hardware Top Prospects Game
Cherry returned as coach for the 2010 Home Hardware Top Prospects Game, with Brian Kilrea and Bert O'Brien as assistants. Team Orr was coached by Jody Hull of the Peterborough Petes, and Marty Williamson of the Niagara IceDogs. Team Cherry scored three times in the third period to win the game. Players of the game were Taylor Hall of the Windsor Spitfires, and Jeff Skinner of the Kitchener Rangers.

2011 Home Hardware Top Prospects Game
Cherry returned as coach for the 2011 Home Hardware Top Prospects Game, with Brian Kilrea and Bert O'Brien as assistants. Team Orr was coached by Wendel Clark, Doug Gilmour of the Kingston Frontenacs, and Stan Butler of the Brampton Battalion. Team Orr scored four times on way to a 7–1 victory. Zack Phillips of the Saint John Sea Dogs, led all scorers with three points.

2012 Home Hardware Top Prospects Game
For the 2012 Home Hardware Top Prospects Game, Team Cherry was coached by Mark Recchi, and assistant Ryan Huska of the Kelowna Rockets. Team Orr was coached by Pat Quinn, and assistant Don Hay of the Vancouver Giants. Players of the game were Branden Troock of the Seattle Thunderbirds, and goaltender Matt Murray of the Sault Ste. Marie Greyhounds.

2013 Home Hardware Top Prospects Game
Don Cherry returned as a coach, and Team Orr was coached by Mike McPhee. Team Orr outshot Team Cherry 36–20, and won 3–0. Players of the game were Tristan Jarry of the Edmonton Oil Kings, and Laurent Dauphin of the Chicoutimi Saguenéens.

2014 BMO Top Prospects Game

The CHL announced Bank of Montreal (BMO) as the corporate title sponsor of the event, starting in 2014, and several Calgary Flames celebrities to coach the 2014 BMO Top Prospects Game. Team Cherry was led by Jim Peplinski and Paul Reinhart, joined by broadcaster Nick Kypreos, and the general manager of the London Knights, Mark Hunter. Team Orr was led by Tim Hunter, Joel Otto, Mike Vernon, and former NHL coach, Doug MacLean. Team Orr scored three times in the second period, and won 4–3. Players of the game were Nikolay Goldobin of the Sarnia Sting, and Jared McCann of the Sault Ste. Marie Greyhounds.

2015 BMO Top Prospects Game
Cherry and Orr both returned as coaches for the 2015 BMO Top Prospects Game. Brian Kilrea and Bert O'Brien assisted Cherry, and Orr was joined by Niagara IceDogs' coaches Billy Burke and David Bell. Travis Konecny of the Ottawa 67's, and Timo Meier of the Halifax Mooseheads, both scored three points, leading Team Orr to a 6–0 victory.

2016 BMO Top Prospects Game
Cherry and Orr returned as coaches for the 2016 BMO Top Prospects Game. Brian Kilrea and Bert O'Brien returned as assistants to Cherry, and Glen Hanlon and Todd Warriner joined Orr. Team Orr was led to victory by three points each from Pascal Laberge of the Victoriaville Tigres, and Pierre-Luc Dubois of the Cape Breton Screaming Eagles.

2017 Sherwin-Williams Top Prospects Game

The CHL announced Sherwin-Williams as the corporate title sponsor of the event, starting in 2017. The 2017 Sherwin-Williams Top Prospects Game featured four celebrity coaches, all of whom played junior hockey for the Quebec Remparts. Team Cherry was led by Simon Gagné and Pierre Lacroix, and the head coach of the Quebec Remparts, Philippe Boucher. Team Orr was led by Guy Chouinard and Dave Pichette, and the head coach of the Drummondville Voltigeurs, Dominique Ducharme. Team Cherry scored three times on the power play, and won 7–5. Players of the game were Henri Jokiharju of the Portland Winterhawks, and Nico Hischier of the Halifax Mooseheads.

2018 Sherwin-Williams Top Prospects Game
Don Cherry returned as a celebrity coach, joined by James Richmond of the Mississauga Steelheads, and assistants Brian Kilrea, Bert O'Brien. Team Orr was coached by Eric Lindros, joined by the Guelph Storm's coaching staff, George Burnett, Jake Grimes, and Luca Caputi. Team Cherry scored the first five goals of the game, en route to a 7–4 victory. Filip Zadina of the Halifax Mooseheads, Aidan Dudas of the Owen Sound Attack, and Ty Dellandrea of the Flint Firebirds, all scored two goals each in the victory.

2019 Sherwin-Williams Top Prospects Game
Ron MacLean coached Team Cherry, assisted by Dave Hunter and Brent Sutter. Kelly Hrudey returned to the Top Prospects Game to coach Team Orr, assisted by Marc Habscheid and Robyn Regehr. Team Orr scored four third period goals to win 5–4. Graeme Clarke of the Ottawa 67's, and Brett Leason of the Prince Albert Raiders both had a goal and an assist for Team Orr. Arthur Kaliyev of the Hamilton Bulldogs, and Nick Robertson of the Peterborough Petes both scored three points for Team Cherry.

2020 Kubota Top Prospects Game
The CHL announced Kubota as the corporate title sponsor of the event, starting in 2020. Rob Wilson from the Peterborough Petes coached Team Red, and George Burnett from the Guelph Storm coached Team White. Tyson Foerster from the Barrie Colts, and Connor Zary from the Kamloops Blazers both scored three points in a 5–3 victory for Team White. Jeremie Poirier from the Saint John Sea Dogs scored two points for Team Red in the loss.

2022 Kubota Top Prospects Game
Following a one-year hiatus as a result of the COVID-19 pandemic, the CHL announced the return of the Top Prospects Game in 2022. Team Red was coached by Kitchener Rangers head coach Mike McKenzie along with Rangers alumnus and Memorial Cup champion Derek Roy as well as TSN OverDrive's Jamie McLennan and Bryan Hayes. Team White was again coached by Guelph Storm head coach George Burnett, this time with CHL legend Brian Kilrea as well as TSN OverDrive's Jeff O’Neill and Michael DiStefano.

See also
CCM/USA Hockey All-American Prospects Game

References

External links 
 Top Prospects Game web site

Canadian Hockey League events